Federalist No. 18 is an essay by James Madison, the eighteenth of The Federalist Papers. It was published on December 7, 1787, under the pseudonym Publius, the name under which all The Federalist papers were published. No. 18 addresses the failures of the Articles of Confederation to satisfactorily govern the United States; it is the fourth of six essays on this topic. It is titled "The Same Subject Continued: The Insufficiency of the Present Confederation to Preserve the Union". Madison draws historical parallels between the Confederation and Ancient Greece, where both the Amphictyonic League and the Achaean League ended in tyranny and disintegration. This illustrates the importance of a closer union.

External links 

 Text of The Federalist No. 18: congress.gov

1787 in American law
18
1787 essays
1787 in the United States